Sawai Madhopur Zila Parishad is one of the 33 Zila Parishads of Rajasthan.

Zila Parishad Members

References

Panchayati raj (India)